Sugar is a TV cooking show shown on Food Network Canada hosted by Canadian pastry chef Anna Olson. The official show description reads "Anna Olson satisfies sweet cravings with great dessert recipes and guides viewers from making to plating with presentation ideas to dress up any dessert."

Premiered in October 2002, Sugar is a half-hour show which specializes in desserts.  Each episode has a theme ingredient.  Host Anna Olson makes one simple dessert with the theme ingredient in the first part of the show.  During the second and third part, she creates a more elaborate or decadent dessert with the same ingredient. During the last few minutes of the program called the "Switch-Up", Anna re-invents the first dessert with a few tricks and turns it into something more special.

Sugar aired for five seasons on Food Network Canada and its 151 episodes has been syndicated in 40 countries.

Episode list
The following is a complete list of episodes from Sugar.

Season 1

Season 2

Season 3

Season 4

Season 5

Media releases

DVDs
Echo Bridge Entertainment, who acquired Alliance Atlantis International Distribution has started to release Sugar on DVD.

Books
Two books have been derived based on recipes from the shows, published by Whitecap Books.
Sugar (Whitecap Books, April 2004)
Another Cup of Sugar (Whitecap Books, October 2006)

Notes

External links

Official Show Page on Foodtv.ca 

Food Network (Canadian TV channel) original programming
2000s Canadian cooking television series
2002 Canadian television series debuts
2007 Canadian television series endings